Sayyid Ahmad Alamolhoda (also Alam Olhoda or Alam al-Hoda; ; born September 1, 1944) is an Iranian Shia Islamic cleric who has been described as "senior" and "ultra conservative" and "hardline." His rank has been given both as  Hojjatoleslam and Ayatollah.  He is the Friday Prayer leader in Mashhad, Iran and is also that city's representative in the Iranian Assembly of Experts. Alamolhoda is a member of Combatant Clergy Association.

Alamolhoda name appeared in the international media as a speaker at a December 30, 2009 rally held in favor of the Islamic regime,  where he was quoted as calling opponents of the Supreme Leader Ali Khamenei In comments broadcast on Iranian state TV, Alamolhoda told demonstrators,

"Enemies of the leader, according to the Quran, belong to the party of Satan ... Our war in the world is war against the opponents of the rule of the supreme leader."

Alamolhoda was also a strong critic of Akbar Hashemi Rafsanjani, the previous head of the Assembly of Experts, whom Alamolhoda attacked for “his silence in the face of unprecedented insults against the leader of the revolution” (Ali Khamenei), and warned to “reform his behavior before it was too late.”

See also
 List of Ayatollahs
 Abdol Javad Alamolhoda

References

Ebrahim Raisi
Iranian Shia clerics
Living people
1944 births
Combatant Clergy Association politicians
Representatives of the Supreme Leader in the Provinces of Iran